Outbound is the fourth solo album by Stuart Hamm, an American bass player known for his playing style and work with artists such as Steve Vai.

Track listing 
 Outbound
 ...Remember
 The Castro Hustle
 Star Spangled Banner
 The Memo
 The Tenacity Of Genes And Dreams
 Charlotte's Song
 A Better World
 Further Down Market
 Lydian (Just Enough For The City)

2000 albums
Stuart Hamm albums
Favored Nations albums